Audlem Baptist Church is in Woore Road, Audlem, Cheshire, England.  It is an active Baptist church, and is recorded in the National Heritage List for England as a designated Grade II listed building.

History
The church was built in 1840, and at a later date a baptistry was added on the north side.

Architecture
The church is constructed in red brick with a slate roof, and is in one storey.  The south front has five bays divided by rendered brick pilasters.  Each bay contains a round-arched window, and above the central window is a rectangular date stone.  At the east end are three blind bays divided by pilasters without rendering.  The west end is the entrance front, and is in three bays separated by rendered pilasters.  A flat-roofed porch projects from the central bay.  The lateral bays each contains a round-headed window with two lights and a round light above.  The baptistry is lower than the church.  Its entrance front is also in three bays with brick pilasters.  It has a central flat-roofed porch supported by slender cast iron Tuscan pillars.

See also

Listed buildings in Audlem

Notes and references
Notes

Citations

Grade II listed churches in Cheshire
Baptist churches in Cheshire
Churches completed in 1840
1840 establishments in England